Convoy HX 300 was the 300th of the numbered series of World War II HX convoys of merchant ships from Halifax to Liverpool.  It started its journey on 17 July 1944 and was the largest convoy of the war, comprising 166 ships.

Background
These HX convoys had been established shortly after declaration of war; and the first sailed on 16 September 1939. Ships in convoy were less vulnerable to submarine attack than ships sailing independently, but the Allies had difficulty providing an adequate number of escorting warships to establish a protective perimeter for detecting and defeating approaching submarines. British Admiralty operations research scientists evaluating convoy battles of 1941 and 1942 determined losses of ships in convoy were independent of convoy size, but varied with the number of attacking submarines and, when patrol aircraft were unavailable, with the number of escorting warships. They suggested convoy losses could be reduced by 64 percent by decreasing the frequency of convoys to increase the average number of merchant ships in each convoy from 32 to 54 and the number of escorting warships from 6 to 9. Additional reduction of losses was theoretically possible with even larger convoys, but difficulties maneuvering large formations of ships and providing port services for simultaneous arrival of so many ships discouraged very large convoys until trade convoy escort warships were required to support the Invasion of Normandy. More than one hundred ships sailed in each of 7 ON convoys and 9 HX convoys during the summer of 1944. Ships sailing from New York City on 17 July 1944 were joined by 30 merchant ships sailing from Halifax Harbour on 19 July, 24 sailing from Sydney, Nova Scotia on 20 July, and 3 from St. John's, Newfoundland and Labrador to form the largest trade convoy of the war.

Escorting warships
Rosthern and the escorts from New York were detached when the remaining ships from Halifax assumed responsibility for the convoy on 20 July. The escorting warships from Sydney detached from the convoy after the escorting warships from Halifax assumed responsibility for the ships from Sydney on 22 July. The latter two corvettes had escorted the merchant ships sailing from St. Johns. Naval trawlers HMS Cape Mariato and HMS Southern Spray assumed responsibility for the convoy in the Western Approaches on 2 August. The convoy was not attacked by submarines and arrived in United Kingdom ports by 3 August 1944.

Results
After the seven Canadian warships of escort group C5 brought the largest convoy of the Battle of the Atlantic safely across the mid-ocean, many of the convoy's ships began offloading food, fuel, and materials to support the civilian population of the British Isles.  One ship from the convoy waited in Loch Ewe to carry supplies to the United States garrison in Iceland; nine ships waited in the Firth of Clyde until convoy JW 59 formed to carry war materials to the Soviet Union; and 46 waited at Oban until channel ports were ready for them to offload food, fuel, and ammunition for Allied armies moving east from France, and trucks, jeeps, half-tracks, and locomotives to move those supplies to the front.  HX 300 was one of six hundred World War II trade convoys from North America to the British Isles.  The following list describes the British, American, Norwegian, Greek, Dutch, Panamanian, Polish, Yugoslavian, French, and Swedish ships of this convoy and the cargoes they were transporting.

Merchant Ships

Notes

References
 
 
 
 
 

HX300
C